SS Arthur R. Lewis was a Liberty ship built in the United States during World War II. She was named after Arthur R. Lewis, a shipping magnate. Lewis founded American and Cuban Steamship Lines, Seas Shipping Company, Planet Line, Overseas Company, and Atlantic Coast Shipping Company.

Construction
Arthur R. Lewis was laid down on 13 March 1944, under a Maritime Commission (MARCOM) contract, MC hull 2475, by the St. Johns River Shipbuilding Company, Jacksonville, Florida; she was sponsored by Mrs. Arthur M. Tode, the wife of the president of the Propeller Club of the United States, and was launched on 27 April 1944.

History
She was allocated to the Seas Shipping Co., Inc., on 5 May 1944. On 2 December 1947, she was laid up in the National Defense Reserve Fleet, Wilmington, North Carolina. She was sold for scrapping, 22 September 1964, to Northern Metal Co., for $45,000. She was removed from the fleet on 22 October 1964.

References

Bibliography

 
 
 
 

 

Liberty ships
Ships built in Jacksonville, Florida
1944 ships
Wilmington Reserve Fleet